Eve V. Clark (born 26 July 1942) is a British-born American linguist. Clark's research focuses on first language acquisition, especially the acquisition of meaning. She has done extensive observational and experimental research. She has also worked on the acquisition and use of word-formation, including comparative studies of English and Hebrew in children and adults. Some of her current studies examine what children can learn about conventional ways to say things based on adult responses to child errors during acquisition. She has studied the pragmatics of coining words.

Biography 
Clark earned her PhD in Linguistics in 1969, studying with John Lyons at the University of Edinburgh. She worked on the Language Universals Project at Stanford with Joseph Greenberg, and two years later, joined the Linguistics Department at Stanford University.  She is currently the Richard Lyman Professor in the Humanities at Stanford.

In January 2017, Clark was one of the speakers in the Linguistic Society of America's inaugural Public Lectures on Language series.

Awards 

 Fellow at the Center for Advanced Study in the Behavioral Sciences at Stanford (1979)
 Guggenheim Fellowship (1983).
 Elected Foreign Member of the Royal Netherlands Academy of Arts and Sciences/Koninklijke Nederlandse Akademie van Wetenschappen (KNAW) in 1991.
 Elected Fellow of the American Association for the Advancement of Science (2003)
 Elected Fellow of the Association for Psychological Science (APS) (2007)
 Fellow of the Cognitive Science Society
 Roger Brown Award from the International Association for the Study of Child Language (IASCL) (2020/2021)

Research 
Clark's work was focused heavily on first-language acquisition, the acquisition of meaning, word formation across children and language, and the varying issues in lexicon and language use. Some of her most remarkable studies come from the interaction of children with adults, where she demonstrates how vital these interactions are for further development of language for young children.

Young children's uptake of new words in conversation

Clark aimed to understand how children register words they haven't heard before by extracting the words and transcripts from five corpora (collection of written/spoken texts) (2007). She hypothesized that, because the repetition of a new word is how children place that word into their language, there will be a difference in repeat-rates for new information and given information. To test the prediction, she compared children's repetition's of the new words to the repetition in the new-to given conversation shifts. The study consisted of 701 new words that were used and exposed to the five children. An example of the way the words were said to the children are as follows:

“Deictic term (this/that/here) + new word

(This) is an + owl

(Here) is a + whisk”

(Clark & Wong, 2002)

The five corpora, or collection of written/spoken speech, were analyzed by three researchers who each observed specific children: Stanley Kuczaj (child: Abe), Jacqueline Sachs (child: Naomi) and Roger Brown (children: Adam, Eve and Sarah). Each child was recorded at different intervals, ranging from twice a week to every other week. To analyze if the children are registering the new words, it was coded every time a child repeated the new word, acknowledged or moved on. Although the children all differed on who initiate the conversation first, her results found that 54% of the time, children repeated the word in their next turn, 38% of the time the child had utterances (move-ons) which were relevant to the new word and topic, and 9% of the time the children said ‘yeah’ (acknowledgement).

Even though the children's acknowledgments were very small in terms of measurement, it displays that the children are capable of understanding and acceptance of the new words, a step forward in grounding the new terms that the adults offered. Children who moved on from the new word continued the conversation in the same semantic field, meaning that although the grasping of the new word may not be verbally recognized, the meaning behind the continued conversation displays a possible grasp on integrating the context into their understanding.

From this study, Clark's results displayed that children repeated the new words about twice as much as they repeated utterance information from ordinary conversations. Her hypothesis was supported in that there is a difference in the function of repetition differs between new words and new information. Children are aware of new words, and rely on the introduction of them using the deictic frame. Clark wanted to continue this phenomenon of children and how they integrate these new words into their vocabulary, so she began to use words that young children surround themselves with everyday, but do not quite get exposed to in language, and that is color.

Color, reference, and expertise in language acquisition

Eve Clark furthered her research on children's understanding of new words, while focusing specifically on the knowledge and identification of colors. She discovered that children find difficulty in learning and understanding the label for each color, so her research led her to study tips to help children. Clark emphasized joint attention as a key piece of acquiring the terms for colors. When the child and the adult share the attention together, the child is able to learn colors, and furthermore, the complex shades and hues of that color. Along with joint attention, Clark found that in order for a child to learn the terms for colors, the child and adult must interact with conversation. Without direct attention, the child will struggle to grasp concepts on their own because there is nobody to tell them what is right or wrong.

Furthering her explanation, Clark tells that a child must first learn the hue. Only after the child has grasped that concept can they start to learn the tints and shades. This concept specifically grows from the interaction with an adult. The child's understanding of the tints or shade of a hue increases when presented by older individuals around them.

Eve Clark's research continues on as she explores how children acquire not only the understanding and meaning of words, but how they can use those words in context.

Conventionality and contrast in language acquisition

Eve Clark looks at how conventionality and contrast both add to language. Convention is defined as a norm, a standard everyone must follow to ensure proper communication. This rule is followed in terms of language as well as general knowledge. Everyone uses the same word to relay the same meaning, and mostly in the same way. When hearing a language for the first time, a child must figure out the meaning of the word in relation to the words around it. The contrasting words give hints to what the unknown word represents. With more context and exposure, children are able to make the connection and learn their first language. If a child and parent are at a zoo learning animals, learning the difference between two striped animals is where conventionality and contrast come in (tiger vs. zebra). While this rule can differentiate between nouns, this also applies when children figure out which tense of a verb to use (telled vs. told).

Conventionality and contrast are essential factors that help build on ones language acquisition, however, Clark also expands on how language acquisition actually can build on cognitive development as well.

How language acquisition builds on cognitive development 
Clark's accomplishments and reputation in linguistics is shown in her ability relate language acquisition to cognition. She details that cognition and language are co-extensive and children first build on what they know before language, and then use language as well in constructing additional categories. Clark's concepts on cognition in relation to language acquisition reinforce that cognition and language interact in a cyclical fashion as children learn more. Clark expresses that words might be regarded as invitations to form categories and to individuate object kinds. Also, Clark believes that language might enable analogies that allow for greater complexity of thought. When discovering language, Clark says that children learn most from their adult figures in their life and how infants pick up on the most frequent nouns, verbs, and adjectives first before extending their range. This suggests that we as children, and as people in general, use representations based not only on representations linked to specific languages, but also on their cognitive development, for categorization, identification, sorting and remembering.

Publications 
Clark H. H. and E. V. Clark (1977). Psychology and Language.

Clark E. V. (1979). Ontogenesis of Meaning.

Clark, E. V. and H. H. Clark (1979). "When nouns surface as verbs," Language 55: 767–811.

Clark E. V. and R. A. Berman (1984). "Structure and use in the acquisition of word formation," Language 60, 542-590.

Clark E. V. (1985). Acquisition of Romance, with special reference to French.

Clark E. V. (1993). The Lexicon in Acquisition.

Clark E. V.  (2003). First Language Acquisition.

Clark, E. V. (2004). How language acquisition builds on cognitive development. Trends in Cognitive Sciences, 8(10), 472-478.

Clark E. V. (2006). Color, reference, and expertise in language acquisition. Journal of Experimental Child Psychology 94(4), 339-343.

Clark E. V. (2007). Conventionality and contrast in language and language acquisition. New Directions for Child & Adolescent Development, 2007(115), 11–23.

Clark E. V.  (2007). Young children's uptake of new words in conversation. Language in Society 36(2), 157-182

References

External links 
 Faculty home page at Stanford University
 "Eve V. Clark: An Oral History," Stanford Historical Society Oral History Program (2016)
 Eve V. Clark publications as indexed by Google Scholar

Linguists from the United States
Women linguists
Living people
1942 births
Alumni of the University of Edinburgh
Stanford University faculty
British emigrants to the United States
Fellows of the American Association for the Advancement of Science
Members of the Royal Netherlands Academy of Arts and Sciences
20th-century linguists
21st-century linguists
Morphologists
Developmental psycholinguists
Fellows of the Cognitive Science Society
Fellows of the American Psychological Association
Fellows of the Linguistic Society of America